is the traditional Japanese art of papercutting, performed on stage to a live audience.  as a style of performing art dates back to Edo period-Japan (1603-1867).

In , the performer takes suggestions from the audience, and quickly cuts a piece of paper with scissors to create the suggested figure to musical accompaniment.

See also

References

Paper art
Japanese art
Performing arts in Japan
Japanese words and phrases